American recording artist Mya Harrison has recorded material for her six studio albums and collaborated with other artists for duets and featured songs on their respective albums and charity singles. After signing a record contract with Interscope Records at the age of 16, Harrison began to work with producer Darryl "Day" Pearson, who co-wrote and co-produced seven out of the 13 songs on her eponymous debut album (1998). Additional contribution came from Nokio the N-Tity and Daryl Simmons, the latter of which produced the album's third single "My First Night with You", a cover version of Deborah Cox's 1995 recording, written by Award-winning musicians Babyface and Diane Warren. Previous singles "Movin' On" and "It's All About Me", both produced by Pearson, featured co-writing by Dru Hill singer Sisqó.

Harrison worked with a wider range of producers on her second album Fear of Flying (2000), including Rodney Jerkins, Wyclef Jean, Robin Thicke, and Jimmy Jam & Terry Lewis to embrace a more mature sound. Lead single "The Best of Me" was co-penned by Teron Beal, Swizz Beatz, and Jadakiss along with singers Jimmy Cozier and Mashonda, while second single "Case of the Ex" marked the singer's first collaboration with producer Tricky Stewart, who would become a frequent collaborator on future projects. As with Fear of Flying, Harrison consulted an array of producers to work on her third album Moodring (2003), including Ron Fair, Timbaland, Rockwilder, Damon Elliott, Knobody. Rapper Missy Elliott composed two tracks for the album — "My Love Is Like...Wo" and "Step". "Lady Marmelade" collaborator Pink co-wrote "Take a Picture.

Harrison's fourth studio album Liberation (2007) was developed by songwriters and producers with whom she had previously collaborated as well as different artists. Scott Storch, Stewart, and Carvin & Ivan each co-wrote and co-produced two songs out of 13, with different writers and producers, including Kwamé, J.R. Rotem, and Bryan Michael Cox also significantly contributing to the album. Sugar & Spice, Harrison's Japan-wide fifth studio album, presented a new creative direction for the singer. Production was primary handled by a variety of low—profile producers such as Arkatech Beatz, Riddim Fingaz, The Smith Bros, and Duke Williams. Harrison, took full creative control co-writing the entire album with producer Christopher Moore and served as executive producer.

Released songs

Unreleased songs

See also 
 Mya discography

References

External links 
 MyaMya.com — official website
 
 

 
Mya